Dragteng Gewog (Dzongkha: བྲག་སྟེང་) is a gewog (village block) of Trongsa District, Bhutan.

References

Gewogs of Bhutan
Trongsa District